Albinaria hippolyti is a species of air-breathing land snails, terrestrial pulmonate gastropod mollusks in the genus Albinaria of the family Clausiliidae, the door snails.

References

Clausiliidae